By a Silken Thread is a 1938 German drama film directed by Robert A. Stemmle and starring Willy Fritsch, Carl Kuhlmann and Käthe von Nagy. The film was intended to be an exposure of "crooked Jewish capitalists" in line with Nazi racial policy of the era. It was shot at the Babelsberg Studios of UFA in Potsdam. The film's sets were designed by the art director Otto Hunte.

Cast
 Willy Fritsch as Richard Hellwerth
 Carl Kuhlmann as Wilhelm Eickhoff
 Käthe von Nagy as Lissy Eickhoff
 Stella David as Wirtschafterin Frida Mann
 Bernhard Minetti as Dr. Heinrich Breuer
 Erich Ponto as Theodor Kalbach
 Willi Schur as Werkmeister Schwafels
 Paul Bildt as Bankier Brögelmann
 Eduard Wandrey as Justizrat Bellert
 Hildegard Barko as Dienstmädchen Anna
 Ina Albrecht as Gast bei Eickhoffs Fest
 Johanna Blum as Gast bei Eickhoffs Fest
 Hildegard Busse as Gast bei Eickhoffs Fest
 Alfred Karen as Gast bei Eickhoffs Fest
 Ethel Reschke as Gast bei Eickhoffs Fest
 Rudolf Schündler as Von Tettenboom
 Peter Elsholtz as Passagier auf dem Rückkehrschiff
 Robert Forsch as Passagier auf dem Rückkehrschiff
 Vera Hartegg as Passagier auf dem Rückkehrschiff
 Walter Schramm-Duncker as Passagier auf dem Rückkehrschiff
 Erich Bartels as Reisender im Zugabteil
 Brunhilde Födisch as Reisende im Zugabteil
 Ursula Zeitz as Dienstmädchen bei Eickhoffs Fest
 Adolf Fischer as Arbeiter bei Hellwerth
 Wolfgang Staudte as Arbeiter bei Hellwerth
 Hans Sobierayski as Polizist, der Lizzy abführt
 Clemens Hasse as Polizist bei der Razzia
 Hellmuth Passarge as Polizist bei der Razzia
 Illo Gutschwager as Arbeiter bei der Firma Hellwerth
 Wera Schultz as Gast bei Eickhoffs Fest
 Werner Pledath as Polizeikommissar bei der Verhaftung
 Georg H. Schnell as Dr. Klipper
 Hermann Pfeiffer as Büring
 Wilfried Seyferth as Verkäufer der Firma Hellwerth
 Fritz Klaudius as Herr Kundmann
 Eduard Bornträger as Fabrikant
 Eric Harden as Fabrikant
 Hermann Meyer-Falkow as Fabrikant
 Hans Timerding as Fabrikant
 Alfred Heynisch as Begleiter Eickhoffs bei der Hochzeitstafel
 Erik von Loewis as Begleiter Eickhoffs bei der Hochzeitstafel
 Franz Weilhammer as Begleiter Eickhoffs bei der Hochzeitstafel
 Liesl Eckardt as Beschäftigte an den neuen Maschinen
 Karl Morvilius as Beschäftigter an den neuen Maschinen
 Albert Venohr as Beschäftigter an den neuen Maschinen
 Hildegard Friebel as Büroangestellte bei Hellwerth
 Hildegard Unger as Büroangestellte bei Hellwerth
 Alfred Pussert as Diener Eickhoffs
 Otto F. Henning as Vorsitzender des Arbeitsgerichts
 Kurt Klotz-Oberland as Jurist bei der Gerichtssitzung
 F.W. Schröder-Schrom as Jurist bei der Gerichtssitzung
 Walter Kunkel as Young lawyer
 Kurt Waitzmann as Young lawyer
 Inge Conradi as Frl. Fichtner
 Karl Fisser
 Käthe Jöken-König
 Hellmuth Lang
 Kurt Weisse

References

Bibliography 
 Klaus, Ulrich J. Deutsche Tonfilme: Jahrgang 1938. Klaus-Archiv, 1988.
 Kreimeier, Klaus. The Ufa Story: A History of Germany's Greatest Film Company, 1918–1945. University of California Press, 1999.

External links 
 

1938 films
Films of Nazi Germany
German drama films
1938 drama films
1930s German-language films
Films directed by Robert A. Stemmle
UFA GmbH films
German black-and-white films
1930s German films
Films shot at Babelsberg Studios